The Slovenian Guards Unit is the official ceremonial honor guard unit of the Slovenian Army. Officially referred as the Guard of the Slovenian Armed Forces (Častna garda Slovenske vojske) by SV members, the guard is a unit of the SV, consisting of the General Staff of the SV. The guard carries out many tasks of insuring that protocol in the SV is ensured.

It was established in 1991 from former ceremonial units in the Yugoslav People's Army. The guard is intended to be present at all events at state and ministerial level, in units and commands of the SAF and local communities at home and abroad. Within the framework of its tasks, it is responsible for carrying out all types of military and military protocol, among which are:

 Provide military honors for high-ranking guests of the country (heads of state, heads of government, defense ministers, army chiefs and other military officials) in state arrival ceremonies
 Take part in the execution of funeral honors for fallen soldiers and serve as pallbearers during state funerals 
 Performing synchronized drill routines
 Provide ceremonial security to the commander in chief

The guard at the President's Office
Since June 25, 2013 (Statehood Day), the unit has posted guards at the Government Building and President's Office on public holidays from 8 AM - 6 PM. This was instituted by order President Borut Pahor who explained the decision in the following words:

Uniform 
The guard has its own distinct uniform which is separate from the rest of the uniforms of the SV. The uniform is worn by members guard during protocol tasks and in accordance with the Rules on Service in the Slovenian Armed Forces and the Rules on Protocol. The uniform color consists of a green and blue and includes a jacket, trousers with a belt, and a cap/beret, a shirt and tie under a jacket, brown leather boots, and white gloves and socks. The belt and shoulder cords of the unit are golden yellow.

Arms

 3x protocol Zastava Arms 76 mm mountain gun M48
 Zastava M59/66 semi-automatic rifle
 Zastava M70 assault rifle

Gallery

References

Military of Slovenia
1991 establishments in Slovenia
Military units and formations established in 1991
Guards of honour
Military units and formations of Slovenia